Lasinavir (INN, previously known as BMS-234475 and CGP-61755) is an experimental peptidomimetic protease inhibitor researched by Novartis and Bristol-Myers Squibb as a treatment for HIV infection. It was originally discovered by Novartis at Basel (Switzerland).
Its investigation was terminated after Phase I on October 09, 2002.

References

Abandoned drugs
Secondary alcohols
Carboxamides
Carbamates
HIV protease inhibitors
Tert-butyl compounds